The men's 200 metre individual medley event at the 2020 Summer Olympics was held from 28 to 30 July 2021 at the Tokyo Aquatics Centre. It was the event's twelfth appearance, having been first held in 1968 and 1972 and then at every edition since 1984.

Summary
Rio 2016 bronze medalist and top qualifier Wang Shun put up a strong performance in the finals, leading at the 100th meters mark and placing second at the 150th meters mark. He swam a stunning final freestyle leg to touch the wall first in a new Asian record of 1:55.00, beating second place Duncan Scott by 0.28 seconds to become the first Asian male swimmer to win a gold medal at the men's 200m individual medley at any Olympic Games.

Hot favorite U.S. swimmer Michael Andrew, who was leading at the 150th meters mark, failed to hold on for the last leg despite having a full second lead. He finished in the fifth position.

Records
Prior to this competition, the existing world and Olympic records were as follows.

Qualification

 
The Olympic Qualifying Time for the event is 1:59.67. Up to two swimmers per National Olympic Committee (NOC) can automatically qualify by swimming that time at an approved qualification event. The Olympic Selection Time is 2:03.26. Up to one swimmer per NOC meeting that time is eligible for selection, allocated by world ranking until the maximum quota for all swimming events is reached. NOCs without a male swimmer qualified in any event can also use their universality place.

Competition format

The competition consists of three rounds: heats, semifinals, and a final. The swimmers with the best 16 times in the heats advance to the semifinals. The swimmers with the best 8 times in the semifinals advance to the final. Swim-offs are used as necessary to break ties for advancement to the next round.

Schedule
All times are Japan Standard Time (UTC+9)

Results

Heats
The swimmers with the top 16 times, regardless of heat, advanced to the semifinals.

Semifinals
The swimmers with the best 8 times, regardless of heat, advanced to the final.

Final

References

Men's 00200 metre individual medley
Olympics
Men's events at the 2020 Summer Olympics